Kuriakose Mar Clemis (born 1936) is Metropolitan of Thumpamon Diocese of the Malankara Orthodox Syrian Church (transferred from Sultan Bathery). He was born 26 July 1936.

Ordinations
He was ordained as a deacon in 1957, as a priest in 1964 and as a bishop in 1991.

References

1936 births
Catholicoi of the East and Malankara Metropolitans
Living people